New Scots are people of any background who have immigrated to Scotland.

The term is used to describe new immigrants from anywhere outside of Scotland. The underlying principle of the term is that national identity is a matter of choice rather than an accident of birth.

See also
Demographics of Scotland
Scottish Asian
Black Scottish people

Bibliography 
 Bashir Maan, The New Scots: The Story of Asians in Scotland, John Donald Publishers Ltd (29 Aug 1997), 
 Bashabi Fraser (Photography by Hermann Rodrigues) Ragas and Reels- Collection of poems telling the stories told in Hermann Rodrigues intricate portraits on The Scots Asian Diaspora Luath Press Publishers Ltd. (1 Aug 2012), 

Immigration to Scotland
Demographics of Scotland